Bishop Paul Simick is a prelate serving as Vicar Apostolic of Nepal and the Titular Bishop of Maturba.

Early life and education 
Simick was born on 7 August 1963 in Gitdubling, West Bengal, India. He studied philosophy and theology from the Morning Star Regional Seminary, Barrackpore, Kolkata. He completed his master's degree, a licentiate and doctorate in Biblical Theology from the Pontifical Urbaniana University in Rome.

Priesthood 
Simick was ordained a Catholic priest on 9 April 1992 and served as Hostel Prefect of Namchi Public School in Sikkim. He was the pastor of St. Maurice Parish, Suruk, Darjeeling; parish priest at Christ the King Parish, Pakyong, East Sikkim; and parish priest at the Immaculate Conception Cathedral in Darjeeling. He also served as the Dean of the East Sikkim Deanery and Treasurer of St. Xavier's School, Pakyong. He served as a professor of Scripture at Barrackpore regional seminary.

Episcopate 
He was appointed Vicar Apostolic of Nepal and Titular Bishop of Maturba, replacing Bishop Anthony Francis Sharma, on 25 April 2014 and ordained a bishop on 29 June 2014 by Salvatore Pennacchio.

References 

20th-century Indian Roman Catholic priests
1963 births
Living people
People from West Bengal
21st-century Roman Catholic bishops in Nepal